Lung Shao-hua (25 March 1953 – 14 September 2021) was a Taiwanese actor, singer and television host.

Lung was found unresponsive in Kaohsiung on 14 September 2021 by the film crew he was working with, and declared dead after arriving at Yuan's General Hospital.

Filmography

Television series

Film

Variety show

Discography

Studio albums

Published works

Awards and nominations

References

External links

 

 

1953 births
2021 deaths
20th-century Taiwanese male actors
21st-century Taiwanese male actors
20th-century Taiwanese  male singers
Taiwanese male film actors
Taiwanese male television actors
Taiwanese television presenters